The 1948 Florida State Seminoles football team represented Florida State University as a member of the Dixie Conference during the 1948 college football season. Led by first-year head coach Don Veller, the Seminoles compiled an overall record of 7–1 with a mark of 4–0 in conference play, winning the Dixie Conference title.

Schedule

References

Florida State
Florida State Seminoles football seasons
Florida State Seminoles football